Polymnia johnbeckii, commonly called Beck's leafcup, is a species of flowering plant in the family of Asteraceae.  It is a perennial forb found in a single state of the United States. It has white/yellow flowers.

Distribution
Polymnia johnbeckii is found in only one of the United States in the state of Tennessee.

References

Asteroideae